Christopher Neil Dickinson (born 4 November 1994) is an English semi-professional footballer who plays as a striker for Northern League Division Two club Billingham Town. He has a younger brother in law called James who plays for Guisborough Town Whites U16s and he has been quoted to be “one of the most promising full backs of this generation” by Chris himself.

Career
Dickinson was born in Stockton-on-Tees, County Durham. He started his career with Darlington's youth system in 2008 and was the youth team top scorer in the 2011–12 season. Following Darlington's relegation from the Conference Premier he joined York City in July 2012, the newly promoted League Two club taking over the second year of his scholarship. While still a trainee with York he went to Northern League Division Two club Northallerton Town on loan during December 2012, making his debut as a 60th-minute substitute for Carl Chillingsworth in a 2–0 defeat away to Crook Town on 29 December. He made one more outing as a substitute before returning to York with two Northallerton appearances to his name.

Dickinson signed a one-year professional contract with York in June 2013 and rejoined Northallerton one a one-month loan in September. He made his second debut for the club in a 3–0 away win over Ryton & Crawcrook Albion on 14 September 2013, and scored his first career goal with an early equaliser in Northallerton's 4–2 home defeat to Chester-le-Street Town on 28 September. After scoring once in six appearances Northallerton wanted to extend Dickinson's loan once it expired, but York manager Nigel Worthington preferred to loan him to a club in a higher division. He then joined Northern Premier League Premier Division side Whitby Town on a one-month loan on 1 November 2013. His debut came a day later as a 69th-minute substitute for Steven Snaith in a 2–1 away win over Stamford. Dickinson made his only start for Whitby against Brigg Town in a Northern Premier League Challenge Cup match that ended in a 6–5 penalty shoot-out defeat following a 0–0 draw after extra time, and finished the loan with four appearances. He made his debut for York as a 90th-minute substitute for Ryan Bowman in a 4–0 away win over Plymouth Argyle on 15 February 2014. After making two appearances for the club he was released in May 2014.

Dickinson signed for Conference North club Boston United ahead of their opening match of 2014–15 on 9 August 2014, and scored in this match as his new team beat Barrow 2–1 at home. However, he left the club on 29 August 2014 to find a club closer to his home in the North East, having scored one goal in four appearances for Boston. Dickinson signed for Scottish League Two club Annan Athletic in January 2015, making his debut as a 76th-minute substitute for Kieran Brannan in a 3–2 home defeat to Elgin City on 10 January. He made four appearances before being released by Annan in May 2015.

After a spell with Northern League Division One club West Auckland Town, Dickinson signed for Billingham Town of the Northern League Division Two in October 2015. A month later, he joined their divisional rivals Billingham Synthonia, debuting at home to Chester-le-Street on 28 November 2015. Scoring 5 goals from 23 appearances, he rejoined Billingham Town in the summer of 2016.

Career statistics

References

External links

1994 births
Living people
Footballers from Stockton-on-Tees
Footballers from County Durham
English footballers
Association football forwards
Darlington F.C. players
York City F.C. players
Northallerton Town F.C. players
Whitby Town F.C. players
Boston United F.C. players
Annan Athletic F.C. players
West Auckland Town F.C. players
Billingham Town F.C. players
Billingham Synthonia F.C. players
Northern Football League players
Northern Premier League players
English Football League players
National League (English football) players
Scottish Professional Football League players